Alan Wilkinson (7 August 1924 – 12 March 2015) was a New Zealand football (soccer) player who represented his country at international level.

Wilkinson made a single appearance in an official international for New Zealand in a 0–6 loss to South Africa on 5 July 1947.

References 

1924 births
2015 deaths
New Zealand association footballers
New Zealand international footballers
Sportspeople from Waikato
Association football forwards